Mark-Francis Vandelli (born 14 October 1989) is an English television personality. He is best known for his role on the E4 series Made in Chelsea.

Career
In April 2011, Vandelli joined the cast of semi-reality television programme Made in Chelsea for the first series. He is the only male cast member to appear in all series of the show to date. On 16 January 2016, it was announced that he would be competing in the third series of The Jump. He withdrew from the show on 9 February due to injury. In 2017, he appeared in a Made in Chelsea spin-off entitled Mark-Francis' Big Night Out.

Personal life
Vandelli was educated at Hill House School, St Paul's School and read for a degree in Art History at University College London. Vandelli is the only son of Marzio Vandelli, an Italian businessman and former tile factory owner, and Diane Casserley Vandelli. While promotional material associated with Vandelli often claims that his mother is a descendant of the aristocratic Russian Orlov-Romanovsky family, she is largely of English descent with some distant Irish ancestry and one Russian great-great-grandmother who emigrated to England in the nineteenth century as an impoverished orphan.

Filmography

Guest appearances
 Alan Carr: Chatty Man – (4 May 2012)
 Celebrity Juice – (17 November 2013)
 Virtually Famous – (13 April 2015, 22 March 2016)

References

External links

1988 births
Living people
Alumni of University College London
British people of Irish descent
British people of Italian descent
British people of Russian descent
People educated at Hill House School
People educated at St Paul's School, London
Participants in British reality television series
Made in Chelsea